Sigve Brekke (born 15 December 1959) is the President and CEO of Telenor Group, an international telecommunications company present in 13 markets across the Nordic region, Europe and Asia.

Telenor career
Sigve Brekke has been a member of the Executive Management team of Telenor Group since 2008, and succeeded Jon Fredrik Baksaas as president and CEO in August 2015. From 2008 to 2015, Sigve Brekke was responsible for Telenor's operations in Asia.

Sigve Brekke joined Telenor in 1999 as Manager Business Development and later managing director of its Singapore office. He worked as co-Chief Executive Officer of Thai mobile operator dtac (part of the Telenor Group) from 2002 to 2005, and chief executive officer in Dtac from 2005 to 2008. He has also worked as managing director of Uninor from 2010 to 2013. From September 2014 to March 2015, Sigve Brekke served as interim CEO at dtac.

Political career
Prior to joining Telenor, Sigve Brekke was a politician. He was the secretary-general of the Workers' Youth League from 1989 to 1992. In March 1993 he was appointed as a political adviser in the Ministry of Defence, being a part of Brundtland's Third Cabinet. In November 1993 he was promoted to State Secretary in the Ministry of Defence, where he served until 1996.

Education 
He holds a Mid-Career Master in Public Administration (MC/MPA) - a one-year program - from the John F. Kennedy School of Government, Harvard University. He has also been an associate research fellow at the same school.

Controversies regarding education
After entering the position as CEO in Telenor it was revealed that Sigve Brekke did not complete an undergraduate degree in business administration at the Telemark University College (now University of South-Eastern Norway), although he in an interview with business magazine Kapital had claimed to have done so. Brekke quickly admitted that his educational background had been misrepresented, though not deliberately. As of 19 November 2015 "Ministry of Trade and Industry [informed] that they now have asked the board of directors of Telenor about an evaluation of the process leading to hiring Brekke as chief of the corporation".

Brekke has previously claimed that he held a Degree in Agricultural Sciences from Agricultural College Kongsberg, that Brekke told Kapital is a two-year vocational school within forestry.

On 20 March 2016 Aftenposten said that "Bloomberg and Wall Street Journal claim in their profiles on Brekke that he has two bachelor degrees", while in reality he has none.

References 

 Telenor Group Executive Management (on telenor.com)

External links
- Du jukser ikke med CV-en din

1959 births
Living people
Harvard Kennedy School alumni
Norwegian expatriates in the United States
Norwegian state secretaries
Labour Party (Norway) politicians
Telenor